Tampereen Peli-Pojat-70 (abbreviated PP-70) is a football club from Tampere, Finland that was established in 1970. PP-70 currently plays in the Nelonen with its home venue at the Ikurin Virelä (Ikuri Sports Field).

History

PP-70 were formed in 1970 following the amalgamation of the football sections of Lielahden Kipinä, Pispalan Tarmo and Lamminpään Korpi.  In its early years the club played in the lower divisions of the Finnish football system but in 1985 were promoted for the first time to the Kakkonen which is the third tier. In total the club has enjoyed 4 spells at this level from 1986 to 1988, 1993–1994, 1996–2001 and 2008–2009.  In 1994 the club were promoted to the Ykkönen and while their first experience at this level lasted only one season they were again promoted to the Ykkönen in 2001.  The most successful period of the club then followed with six seasons in the Ykkönen from 2002 until 2007 when they were relegated to the Kakkonen.  A further relegation followed in 2009 and 2010 and the club are currently in the Nelonen.

Divisional Movements

Second Level (7 seasons): 1995, 2002–07
Third Level (13 seasons): 1986–88, 1993–94, 1996–2001, 2008–09

Season to season

Junior Section

PP-70 are undertaking commendable work at the junior level and are growing steadily with the addition of new age groups each year.  In total the club runs 15 junior teams and team practice is available for boys and girls all the year round.

2010 season

PP-70 are competing in the Kolmonen administered by the Tampere SPL.  This is the fourth highest tier in the Finnish football system.  In 2009 PP-70S were relegated from Group B of the Kakkonen.

PP-70 /2 are participating in the Vitonen administered by the Tampere SPL.

References and sources
Official Website
Finnish Wikipedia
Suomen Cup

Football clubs in Finland
Association football clubs established in 1970
1970 establishments in Finland